The Hay Internment and POW camps at Hay, New South Wales, Australia were established during World War II as prisoner-of-war and internment centres, due in no small measure to the isolated location of the town. Three high-security camps were constructed in 1940. The first arrivals were over two thousand refugees from Nazi Germany and Austria, most of whom were Jewish; they had been interned in the United Kingdom when fears of an armed invasion of Britain were at their peak. 

The British government then forcibly transported these refugees to Australia on the HMT Dunera. The internees were kept in conditions on board the Dunera that were cruel and inhumane, and after the war the Dunera story became quite infamous, leading the British government to apologise for their egregious mistreatment of innocent civilian refugees. 

The internees arrived at Hay on 7 September 1940 by four trains from Sydney. They were interned in Camps 7 and 8 (located near the Hay showground) under the guard of the 16th Garrison Battalion of the Australian Army. In November 1940 the other compound at Hay, Camp 6 (near the Hay Hospital), was occupied by Italian civilian internees. Camps 7 and 8 were vacated in May 1941 when the Dunera internees left Hay; some were sent to Orange (NSW), others to Tatura in Victoria, and others to join the Pioneer Corps of the Australian Army. 

Upon their departure, Italian prisoners-of-war were placed in Camps 7 and 8. In December 1941 Japanese internees (some from Broome and islands north of Australia) were conveyed to Hay and placed in Camp 6. In April 1942 the River Farm began operating on the eastern edge of the township, enabling market-gardening and other farm activities to be carried out by the Italian internees and POWs. In February 1945, in the wake of the Cowra POW break-out, a large number of Japanese POWs were transferred to Hay and placed in the three high-security compounds. On 1 March 1946 the Japanese POWs departed from Hay in five trains, transferred to Tatura. During 1946 the Italians who remained at Hay were progressively released or transferred to other camps, and the Hay camps were dismantled and building materials and fittings sold off by June the following year.

Hay Military Post Office was open from 4 December 1940 until 29 June 1946, defining the main period of use of the facility.

The first group of internees at Hay became known as the ‘Dunera Boys’. The internment at Hay of this assemblage of refugees from Nazi oppression in Europe was an important milestone in Australia’s cultural history. Just fewer than half of those interned at Hay eventually chose to remain in Australia. The influence of this group of men on subsequent cultural, scientific and business developments in Australia is difficult to over-state; they became an integral and celebrated part of the nation’s cultural and intellectual life. The 'Dunera Boys' are still fondly remembered in Hay; every year the town holds a 'Dunera Day' in which many surviving internees return to the site of their former imprisonment. Of the 900 'Dunera Boys' who remained in Australia after being sent to the camp, approximately 50 have survived into 2010.

See Also

 HMT Dunera

References

Further reading 
 

World War II internment camps in Australia
World War II prisoner-of-war camps in Australia
Military camps in Australia